Alan Kelley (born 24 December 1952) is an English former professional footballer who played as a fullback. Kelley, who was active in both England and the United States, made over 150 career appearances.

Career
Born in Bootle, Kelley played in the Football League for Southport and Crewe Alexandra, and in the North American Soccer League for the Los Angeles Aztecs, the San Diego Sockers and the California Surf. He played for the California Sunshine and the Cleveland Cobras of the American Soccer League. Kelley also spent several years in the Major Indoor Soccer League playing for the Philadelphia Fever and the Los Angeles Lazers. In recent years, he has been a college assistant coach and a high school head coach in the South Bay area of Los Angeles County in southern California.

External links
Profile at Post War English & Scottish Football League A - Z Player's Transfer Database
NASL/MISL/ASL career stats
NASL indoor stats

References

1952 births
Living people
English footballers
English Football League players
Southport F.C. players
Crewe Alexandra F.C. players
American Soccer League (1933–1983) players
California Sunshine players
Cleveland Cobras players
North American Soccer League (1968–1984) players
North American Soccer League (1968–1984) indoor players
California Surf players
Los Angeles Aztecs players
San Diego Sockers (NASL) players
Major Indoor Soccer League (1978–1992) players
Los Angeles Lazers players
Philadelphia Fever (MISL) players
Association football fullbacks
English expatriate sportspeople in the United States
Expatriate soccer players in the United States
English expatriate footballers
Sportspeople from Bootle